Vibonati (Cilentan: Livunati) is a town and comune in the province of Salerno in the Campania region of south-western Italy.

Geography
Located in southern Cilento, Vibonati is a hilltown nearby the Cilentan Coast, few km far from Sapri, Capitello and Policastro. The municipality borders with Casaletto Spartano, Ispani, Santa Marina, Sapri, Torraca and Tortorella. It as a single hamlet, (frazione), the coastal village of Villammare.

See also
Cilentan dialect
Cilento and Vallo di Diano National Park

References

External links

Cities and towns in Campania
Localities of Cilento